Robert Howe may refer to:

 Robert Howe (footballer) (1903–1979), Scottish international football (soccer) player
 Robert Howe (Continental Army officer) (1732–1786), Major-General in the Continental Army during the American Revolutionary War
 Robert Howe (tennis) (1925–2004), 1958 winner of the Wimbledon mixed doubles championship
 Robert Howe (Australian printer), son of George Howe
 Robert Howe (politician) (1861–1915), former Member of the Australian House of Representatives
 Sir Robert George Howe (1893–1981), British diplomat
 Robert Howe, former CEO of Scient

See also
 Bobby Howe (disambiguation)
 Robert Van Howe, American pediatrician and anti-circumcision activist
 Barry Robert Howe, American bishop